Te Aka Whai Ora is an independent New Zealand government statutory entity tasked with managing Māori health policies, services, and outcomes. The agency is one of four national bodies that oversee New Zealand's health system since 2022, along with the  Ministry of Health, the  Public Health Agency, and Te Whatu Ora. They replaced a system in which a single Ministry funded services through 20 district health boards (DHBs). 

Riana Manuel was appointed to be the first Chief Executive, which has been a permanent agency since 1 July 2022.

Mandate and responsibilities 
Te Aka Whai Ora (the Māori Health Authority) is a statutory entity responsible for ensuring that the New Zealand health system meets the needs of Māori. It will work in partnership with the Ministry of Health and Health New Zealand to achieve the following stated goals:
leading change in the way the entire health system understands and responds to Māori health needs
developing strategy and policy which will improve Māori health outcomes 
commissioning Māori customary services and other services targeting Māori communities
co-commissioning other services alongside Health New Zealand
monitoring the overall performance of the system to reduce Māori health inequities. 

The MHA will work alongside Health New Zealand to create and develop kaupapa Māori services and policies.

History

Policy announcement
On 21 April 2021, Minister of Health Andrew Little announced plans to create the Māori Health Authority, which would be responsible for setting Māori health policies and overseeing the provision of Māori health services. In addition, Little announced that the government would create two other public health bodies: Health New Zealand, to replace the country's district health boards, and the Public Health Authority, to centralise public health work.

The proposed Māori Health Authority was criticised by the opposition National Party health spokesperson Shane Reti, who claimed that it would create a "two-tier system" based on race. Similar sentiments were echoed by National Party leader Judith Collins, who likened it to racial segregation and called for public consultation on the matter. Her remarks were described by Māori Party co-leader Debbie Ngarewa-Packer as "desperate racist politicking." Ngarewa-Packer also urged Collins to read National's own 2020 election review which advocated making Māori a "priority area". In addition, Associate Health Minister Ayesha Verrall stated that the proposed Māori Health Authority could ensure Māori input in funding and improving Māori health outcomes.

Formation
In mid September 2021, the government announced the interim board members of the Māori Health Authority. The organisation will be headed by co-chairs Sharon Shea (chair of the Bay of Plenty District Health Board) and Tipa Mahuta (Deputy Chair of the Counties Manukau District Health Board). Other board members consist of medical specialist and University of Otago Professor Dr Sue Crengle, Dr Mataroria Lyndon, Lady Tureiti Moxon, Fiona Pimm, Awerangi Tamihere, and Dr Chris Tooley (Chief Executive of Te Puna Ora o Mataatua). 

On 15 March 2022, the New Zealand Government allocated NZ$22 million from the 2021 New Zealand budget to the commissioning of the interim Māori Health Authority.

On 19 May 2022, the government allocated a record sum of $13.2 billion from the 2022 New Zealand budget to facilitate the establishment of both the MHA and Health NZ over the next four years; with $11.1 billion being allocated to cover cost pressures from the previous DHB system and $2.1 billion to setting up the two new public health entities. In addition, the government allocated $188 million for the Māori Health Authority to commission services and develop partnerships with iwi (Māori tribes).

In October 2021, the government introduced the Pae Ora (Healthy Futures) Bill to formally entrench its proposed health reforms. These reforms included formally establishing the Māori Health Authority as a new Crown entity. The bill passed its third reading on 7 June 2022.

On 1 July 2022, the MHA formally came into existence as a new entity. The MHA's interim chief executive Riana Manuel stated that the new organisation would work alongside Health NZ. While it would have its own commissioning powers and work with Māori health providers, Manuel clarified that the MHA would also have oversight over the entire health system to ensure equity for Māori. Māori health practitioners Danny De Lore and Reweti Ropiha expressed hope that the new entity would improve Māori health outcomes and combat inequity within the health system.

Notes and references

External links

2022 establishments in New Zealand
Health care in New Zealand
Māori organisations
Medical and health organisations based in New Zealand
New Zealand public service departmental agencies
Indigenous health